St. Clair's Falls is one of the widest waterfalls in Sri Lanka and is commonly known as the "Little Niagara of Sri Lanka". It is one of six waterfalls affected by the Upper Kotmale Hydropower Project.

The falls are located along the Kotmale Oya, a tributary of the Mahaweli River, as it cascades over three rock outcrops into a large pool, running through a tea estate, from which the falls derive their name from. St Clair's falls are the 20th highest waterfall in Sri Lanka.

Environmentalists' concerns 

From the inception of the Upper Kotmale Project, the environmentalists protested concerning that the waterfall is threatened by the Upper Kotmale Dam. The Government however has stated that they will release a limited quantity of water to ensure a continuous flow of  water over the falls for 10 hours and 30 minutes daily, between sunrise and sunset.

See also 
 List of waterfalls of Sri Lanka

References 

Landforms of Nuwara Eliya District
Waterfalls in Central Province, Sri Lanka